Texhoma is the name of twin cities on the border of the Texas and Oklahoma panhandles:

 Texhoma, Texas
 Texhoma, Oklahoma